Scattered is a second compilation of demos, outtakes and rarities by The Handsome Family. It was released 2010 through Handsome Family Music and is the sequel to 2002's Smothered and Covered.

Track listing
"The Lost Soul" - 3:21
version of a traditional
"When It Rains" - 2:25
outtake from Twilight
"Just Like Tom Thumb's Blues" - 5:39
Bob Dylan cover
"Snowball" - 2:16
song by The Handsome Family
"Ain't No Grave" - 2:53
Brother Claude Ely cover	
"Little Buddy" - 3:56
an early track from 1993
"Eleanor Rigby" - 2:45
The Beatles cover	
"A Plague Of Humans" - 3:01
song by The Handsome Family
"Famous Blue Raincoat" - 5:07
Leonard Cohen cover
"Drinking Beer On The Roof" - 3:23
alternate take from "The Red Leaf Forest" (digital-only bonus track from Honey Moon)
"Telephones And Telescopes" - 3:06
a song written by Brett Sparks
"Lost Highway" - 2:59
Leon Payne cover
"Honcho" - 1:58
instrumental recorded by Brett Sparks on 4-track
"The Blizzard" - 3:32
Harlan Howard cover
"What Does The Deep Sea Say?" - 3:37
a version of the song by The Handsome Family (maybe a Bob Miller cover, maybe it's a traditional)
"Tranqualized" - 2:56
a song written by Brett Sparks in 1996
"June Bugs" - 3:36
alternate mix of the song released on Honey Moon
"One Way Up" - 2:37
4-track demo of the song released on Odessa
"Claire Said" - 4:29
an early live recording of the song released on Odessa

References

External links
The Handsome Family official website

2010 compilation albums
The Handsome Family albums